Pino Canessa (20 December 1907 – 9 November 2001) was an Italian sailor. He competed in the Dragon event at the 1948 Summer Olympics.

References

External links
 

1907 births
2001 deaths
Italian male sailors (sport)
Olympic sailors of Italy
Sailors at the 1948 Summer Olympics – Dragon
Sportspeople from the Province of Genoa